Juodupė is a river of  Biržai district municipality, Panevėžys County, northern Lithuania.

References 

Rivers of Lithuania
Biržai District Municipality